Miss Earth Thailand is a national title given to a Thai woman to represent Thailand at the Miss Earth pageant, an annual international major beauty pageant that advocates for environmental awareness, conservation, and social responsibility. 

The current titleholder is Spy Chawanphat Kongnim, another pageant veteran represented the country at Miss Earth 2022 which was held on 29 November 2022 in the Philippines live for the first time after the virtual pageant for two consecutive years 2020 and 2021.

History

2001-2012; 2015-2017: Miss Universe Thailand
The first ever Thai representative in Miss Earth was Victoria Wachholz who placed Top 12 in Miss Thailand Universe 2001. Since 2002, Bangkok Broadcasting & T.V. Co., Ltd. (Channel 7) was awarded the rights and conducted the Miss Thailand Universe pageant and sent the winner to Miss Universe while the 1st Runner-up to Miss Earth pageant. In 2004, Radchadawan Khampeng competed in Miss Earth 2004 and placed in the Top 8 and became Thailand's first finalist in the Miss Earth pageant.

Thailand placed in five consecutive years with Jiraporn Sing-ieam who placed Top 8 in Miss Earth 2007 and won the Best National Costume award, Piyaporn Deejing placed in the Top 16 in Miss Earth 2008, Rujinan Phanseethum also placed in the Top 8 in the Miss Earth 2009 while Watsaporn Wattanakoon placed 2nd Runner-up (Miss Water) and won the Miss Photogenic award in Miss Earth 2010, and Niratcha Tungtisanont placed in the Top 16, won the People's Choice Award and Miss Golden Sunset award in the Miss Earth 2011 pageant.

In 2012, Royal Thai Army Radio and Television Channel 5 was awarded the rights to host and changed name of the pageant. The pageant sent 1st Runner-up to compete at Miss Earth where it was represented by Waratthaya Wongchayaporn.

In 2017, (Channel 7) appointed Organizer M GROUP ORGANIZE & MEDIA CO., LTD. who organized Miss Chiangmai, as the national director of Miss Earth Thailand. The said organization appointed Paweensuda Drouin (one of the 2nd Runners-up Miss Universe Thailand 2017) in the Miss Earth 2017 and where she placed in the Top 8.

2013-2014: New Organizations 

 
In 2013, Organizer IQ Co., Ltd. was awarded the rights to host Miss Earth Thailand pageant and sent a Thai representative to compete in Miss Earth. This came after the Miss Universe Thailand Organization lost its license from the Miss Earth Foundation. Punika Kulsoontornrut was crowned the first Miss Earth Thailand in November 2013 and placed as Miss Earth-Water or the second runner-up.

In 2014, Nawat Itsaragrisil, who owns Miss Grand Thailand, took over the license of Miss Earth. The first runner-up of Miss Grand Thailand was designated as Miss Earth Thailand won by Sasi Sintawee. Itsaragrisil lost the Miss Earth Thailand franchise in 2015 and was awarded back to Bangkok Broadcasting & T.V. Co., Ltd. (Channel 7).

2018: Under Miss All Nations Thailand 
In 2018, ERM Marketing Co., Ltd., Thailand. (Thaimiss) appointed Nirada Chetsadapriyakun who won second runner-up in Miss All Nations Thailand 2017 to represent Thailand at Miss Earth 2018 pageant.

2020-present: Wisdom Thaiasset Co., Ltd.
In 2020, Carousel Production Inc., the owner and organizer of the Miss Earth beauty pageant has granted an authorization to Wisdom Thaiasset Co., Ltd., a company represented by its President, Sirikan Onsonkran, as the franchise organizer to organize a national search for Miss Earth Thailand 2020 - 2022.

Since 2021, the national competition Miss Earth Thailand has been held again after a 8-year hiatus.

Titleholders

Winners by province

Thai representatives at Miss Earth 
Color keys

Notes:
  † Now deceased

Winner's gallery

See also

References

External links 

Miss Earth Thailand
Thailand
Beauty pageants in Thailand
Lists of women in beauty pageants